Éverard III (killed in Palestine on 21 August 1099), son of Hugh I of Le Puiset and Alice of Montlhéry (daughter of Guy I, lord of Montlhéry). Seigneur of Puiset and Viscount of Chartres.

Éverard was in the army of Hugh the Great, that of Stephen of Blois, and then joined with Robert II, Count of Flanders, in the First Crusade. He was instrumental in rallying troops during the siege of Jerusalem and was killed after the capture of Jerusalem.

Éverard married Adelaide, Countess of Corbeil, daughter of Bouchard II, Count of Corbeil, and Adeliade de Crécy,  Éverard and Adelaide had two children:
 Gilduin
 Hugh III (d. 1132), lord of Puiset, Count of Corbeil, Viscount of Chartres.

Upon his death, Éverard was succeeded by his son Hugh as Count of Corbeil.

References

Sources 

 
A Database of Crusaders to the Holy Land, 1095-1149 (archive)

Christians of the First Crusade
1099 deaths
11th-century French people